Agnolini are a type of stuffed egg pasta originating from the province of Mantua (in the Mantuan dialect they are commonly called "agnulìn" or "agnulì") and are oftentimes eaten in soup 
or broth.

The recipe for Agnolotti was first published in 1662 by Bartolomeo Stefani, a cook at the court of the Gonzaga family, in his book  The art of cooking well.
Agnolini's recipe is passed down from generation to generation by Mantuan families.

Agnolini are the main ingredient of soups of the Mantuan cuisine, usually consumed during holidays and important occasions.
According to Mantuan tradition during Christmas Eve chicken broth with the Agnolini alongside other traditional Mantuan dishes such as the Agnolini's soup Sorbir d'agnoli, with abundant addition of parmesan cheese are consumed. Sorbir, to which red wine is added, generally Lambrusco, represents the opening to the Christmas lunch.

Agnolini differ from the classic Emilian tortellini, to which they are similar, due to differences in the ingredients needed for the pasta dough, as well as in shape.

References

Bibliography

See also 
 Agnolotti
 Cappelletti (pasta)
 List of pasta
 Tortellini

Types of pasta
Dumplings
Cuisine of Lombardy